The "Black and White Rag" is a 1908 ragtime composition by George Botsford.

The song was recorded widely for both the phonograph and player piano, and was the third ragtime composition to sell over one million copies of sheet music. The song was first recorded in 1909, as performed by the Victor orchestra for a Victor disc release. The first known cylinder recording of this piece was by Albert Benzler, recorded on Lakeside/U.S.Everlasting Cylinder #380 in June 1911. This recording is somewhat rare (Lakeside/U.S.Everlasting cylinders, though molded celluloid on a wax/fiber core, were made in small batches). Edison featured the "Black and White Rag" on one of his Early Diamond Disc Records (50116) from 1913 played by a Brass Orchestra.

Pianist Wally Rose revitalized interest in the song with his 1941 recording, leading to the one of the best-known versions: a 1952 recording by Trinidadian pianist Winifred Atwell, which helped her to establish an international profile. Originally the B-side of another composition, "Cross Hands Boogie", "Black and White Rag" was championed by the popular disc jockey Jack Jackson, and started a craze for Atwell's honky-tonk style of playing. The recording became a million selling gold record, and in the United Kingdom was later used as the theme tune for the long-running BBC2 television snooker tournament, Pot Black.

"Black and White" Rag was also later arranged for use as the music in the 1985 BBC Computer game Repton and some of its sequels.

The piece has also become a fiddle standard with recordings by musicians such as Johnny Gimble and Benny Thomasson.

References

Links

 The first known recording mentioned above can be heard here. http://cylinders.library.ucsb.edu/search.php?queryType=%40attr+1%3D1020&num=1&start=1&query=cylinder14960

1908 songs
1952 singles
Rags
Songs written by George Botsford
Pot Black